Sébastien Jeanneret (born 12 December 1973 in Le Locle) is a former Swiss football player.

He played mostly for Neuchâtel Xamax, Servette FC and FC Zürich.

He played for Switzerland national football team and was a participant at the 1996 UEFA European Championship.

References

Living people
1973 births
People from Le Locle
Swiss men's footballers
UEFA Euro 1996 players
FC La Chaux-de-Fonds players
Neuchâtel Xamax FCS players
Servette FC players
FC Zürich players
Swiss Super League players
Switzerland international footballers
Association football defenders
Sportspeople from the canton of Neuchâtel